Ascom Holding AG is a telecommunications company focusing on wireless on-site communications.
The company has subsidiaries in 18 countries and a workforce of some 1350 employees worldwide.

Ascom registered shares (symbol ASCN) are listed on the SIX Swiss Exchange in Zurich. Subsidiary is Ascom (Schweiz) AG with former company names Hasler AG, Hasler Ascom AG and Ascom AG.

Ascom services are based on VoWiFi, IP-DECT, Nurse Call, paging technologies, smartphones, apps and software suites for healthcare and enterprise segments. Founded in the 1950s as TATECO (an abbreviation of Tore Andersson, Tele Control) based in Gothenburg, Sweden, Ascom Wireless Solutions is part of Ascom Holding, listed on the Swiss Stock Exchange.

The former division Ascom Network Testing was sold on 30 September 2016 to Infovista.

References

Companies listed on the SIX Swiss Exchange